The Dolgellau Deanery is a Roman Catholic deanery in the Diocese of Wrexham that covers several churches in Gwynedd.

The dean is centred at  Our Lady of Sorrows, Dolgellau

Churches 

 St Tudwal's Church, Barmouth
 St David in Seion, Harlech - served from Barmouth
 St Mary Magdalene, Blaenau Ffestiniog
 Holy Cross, Gellilydan - served from Blaenau Ffestiniog
 Our Lady of Seven Sorrows, Dolgellau
 Our Lady of Fatima, Bala - served from Dolgellau
 The Most Holy Redeemer, Porthmadog
 The Holy Spirit, Criccieth - served from Porthmadog
 St Mary (Church in Wales), Beddgelert - served from Porthmadog
 St David's Church, Tywyn 
 Christ the King, Aberdyfi - Closed August 2016
 St Mair (Our Lady Help of Christians), Machynlleth - served from Tywyn

Gallery

References

External links
 Diocese of Wrexham site

Roman Catholic Deaneries in the Diocese of Wrexham